Dingwall is a town and a royal burgh in the Highland council area of Scotland. It has a population of 5,491. It was an east-coast harbour that now lies inland. Dingwall Castle was once the biggest castle north of Stirling. On the town's present-day outskirts lies Tulloch Castle, parts of which may date back to the 12th century. In 1411 the Battle of Dingwall is said to have taken place between the Clan Mackay and the Clan Donald.

History

Its name, derived from the Scandinavian  (field or meeting-place of the thing, or local assembly; compare Tynwald, Tingwall, Thingwall in the British Isles alone, plus many others across northern Europe), preserves the Viking connections of the town; Gaels call it , meaning "the mouth of the Peffery" or  meaning "cabbage town".

In the early Middle Ages Dingwall Castle, which was established in the 11th century, was reputed to have the largest castle north of Stirling.

King Alexander II created Dingwall a royal burgh in 1226, the burgh becoming the seat of the Earls of Ross. James IV renewed its royal burgh charter in 1497.

It was affected by subsidence, becoming known as the "Leaning Tower", and was later replaced by a much smaller replica.

Dingwall Town Hall, which dates back to 1745, still survives.

James Gillanders of Highfield Cottage near Dingwall, was the Factor for the estate of Major Charles Robertson of Kincardine and, as his employer was then serving with the British Army in Australia, Gillanders was the person most responsible for the mass evictions staged at Glencalvie, Ross-shire in 1845. A Gaelic-language poem denouncing Gillanders for the brutality of the evictions was later submitted anonymously to Pàdraig MacNeacail, the editor of the Canadian Gaelic column in which the poem was later published in the Nova Scotia newspaper The Casket. The poem, which is believed either to be or to draw upon eyewitness accounts, is believed to be the only Gaelic language source of information relating to the evictions in Glencalvie.

Dingwall formerly served as the county town of Ross and Cromarty: the headquarters of Ross and Cromarty County Council, established in 1889, was County Buildings in Dingwall.

The Ferry Road drill hall was completed in 1910.

As a result of storms in late October 2006, Dingwall was subject to widespread flooding the aftermath of which left the town and much of the Highlands north of Inverness, including the A9 and Far North Line, cut off for a time  In August 2019 the town was once again flooded.

Dingwall's Post Office was named the UK's most improved delivery office of the year in Royal Mail’s 2021 Awards.

Geography
The town contains a particularly short canal, the Dingwall Canal, also known locally as the River Peffery.

Sport
Dingwall is the home of football team Ross County, who won promotion to the Scottish Premier League in 2012 and finished the 2012/13 season in fifth place. Despite the town's small population, Ross County attract sizeable crowds to Victoria Park from across the whole surrounding area. The team reached the 2010 Scottish Cup Final, having knocked out Celtic in the previous round.

Ross County won their first piece of major silverware in 2016, winning the Scottish League Cup by beating Hibernian 2–1 in the final.

Transport
Dingwall railway station has been on what is now called the Far North Line since about 1865. It also serves the Kyle of Lochalsh Line.

Dingwall is on the former main road route to the north Highlands (A9). Since the completion of the Cromarty Bridge in 1979, the main road has bypassed Dingwall. Heading west, the A834 joins the A835 road which is the main route to the north west Highlands, including Ullapool.

Education 
Dingwall Academy is the secondary school serving the town and the wider area.

The Highland Theological College is located within the town, housed in a former Scottish Hydro Electric office.

Parliamentary Burgh

Dingwall was a parliamentary burgh, combined with Dornoch, Kirkwall, Tain and Wick in the Northern Burghs constituency of the House of Commons of the Parliament of Great Britain from 1708 to 1801 and of the Parliament of the United Kingdom from 1801 to 1918. Cromarty was added to the list in 1832. The constituency was a district of burghs known also as Tain Burghs until 1832, and then as Wick Burghs. It was represented by one Member of Parliament (MP). In 1918 the constituency was abolished and the Dingwall component was merged into the county constituency of Ross and Cromarty which was itself abolished in 1983.

Notable people
James Fraser of Brea theologian and prisoner on the Bass Rock
Prof James Alexander MacDonald FRSE FIB (1908–1997) botanist, born and raised in Dingwall.
 Major General Sir Hector Archibald MacDonald, KCB, DSO Son of a local Crofter at Rootfield, Dingwall.
John M'Gilligen of Fodderty who held conventicles in houses throughout the county
John Kennedy of Dingwall, Free Church of Scotland minister
Rev Duncan Leitch, Moderator of the General Assembly of the Free Church of Scotland in 1952
Julie Fowlis, a folk singer and multi-instrumentalist
Kate Forbes, member of the Scottish Parliament for Skye, Lochaber and Badenoch and Cabinet Secretary for Finance at the Scottish Government. She was born and went to school in Dingwall.
Thomas Simpson (explorer), Arctic explorer and accused murderer (1808–1840)
Willie Logan, civil engineer and founder of aviation company Loganair
Colin Calder, founder of the Club Atletico Rosario Central  - Argentina on December 24, 1889

Religion

Churches
St Lawrence's Church, opened in 1902.

References

External links

 Dingwall Community Council 
 Dingwall Museum 

 
County towns in Scotland
Ports and harbours of Scotland
Royal burghs
Populated places in Ross and Cromarty
Thing (assembly)
Towns in Highland (council area)
Parishes in Ross and Cromarty